The 1920 Geneva Covenanters football team was an American football team that represented Geneva College as an independent during the 1920 college football season. Led by fourth-year head coach Philip Henry Bridenbaugh, the team compiled a record of 5–2–1.

Schedule

References

Geneva
Geneva Golden Tornadoes football seasons
Geneva Covenanters football